Arginine-rich, mutated in early-stage tumors (ARMET), arginine-rich protein (ARP), or  mesencephalic astrocyte-derived neurotrophic factor (MANF) is a protein that in humans is encoded by the MANF housekeeping gene.

This gene encodes a highly conserved protein whose function is known. The protein was initially thought to be longer at the N-terminus and to contain an arginine-rich region but transcribed evidence indicates a smaller open reading frame that does not encode the arginine tract. The presence of a specific mutation changing the previously numbered codon 50 from ATG to AGG, or deletion of that codon, has been reported in a variety of solid tumors. With the protein size correction, this codon is now identified as the initiation codon.

References

External links

Further reading